Natalie van Gogh (born 14 September 1974) is a Dutch former professional racing cyclist, who rode professionally between 2012 and 2021 for Team Ibis Cycles,  and .

Life and career
Van Gogh was assigned male at birth and later underwent sex reassignment surgery in 2005.

Major results

2009
 6th GP Sankomij Veldhoven
2010
 8th Ronde van Gelderland
2014
 5th Ronde van Overijssel
2015
 1st Trofee Maarten Wynants
 1st Stage 1 Belgium Tour
 2nd Ronde van Overijssel
 3rd Parel van de Veluwe
 7th Gent–Wevelgem
 7th Marianne Vos Classic
 10th Overall BeNe Ladies Tour
2016
 2nd Ronde van Gelderland
 10th Overall BeNe Ladies Tour
2017
 4th 7-Dorpenomloop Aalburg
 9th Omloop van Borsele
2018
 5th Le Samyn des Dames
 8th Overall Healthy Ageing Tour
1st  Sprints classification
2019
 3rd Omloop van Borsele
 10th Omloop van het Hageland

See also
 2014 Parkhotel Valkenburg Continental Team season
 2015 Parkhotel Valkenburg Continental Team season

References

External links

1974 births
Living people
Dutch female cyclists
People from Haarlemmermeer
Dutch transgender people
Transgender women
Transgender sportswomen
Cyclists from North Holland
LGBT cyclists
Dutch LGBT sportspeople
21st-century Dutch women